"Can You Hear Me" is the official song of UEFA Euro 2008 held in Austria and Switzerland. It is performed by Enrique Iglesias, who wrote the song with Steve Morales and Frankie Storm. The song was produced by Big Ben Diehl and Carlos Paucar, and recorded at Circle House Studios in Miami, Florida. The song received generally negative reviews, but achieved success in many European countries where it was a top ten hit.

The song served as Iglesias' third UK single from his Greatest Hits album in June 2009 but failed to enter the UK Top 200.

Background
The choice of this song was announced by UEFA on 20 May, and Iglesias was described as the perfect person for the job. "He is an international star who is passionate about football and who has European roots", said commercial director Philippe Margraff. The artist himself was happy to be chosen; "I'm really pleased to be able to contribute to the football festival in Switzerland and Austria and it is an honour for me to perform at the final", said Iglesias.

The song was performed at the closing game in Vienna on 29 June. The single was released on 26 May, and the video—featuring football tricks and dancing, intercut with Iglesias performing—was directed by Paul Minor. "Can You Hear Me" will also feature on a re-issue of Iglesias' Insomniac album in France, Belgium, Switzerland, Austria, and Italy.

There is also a special UEFA Euro 2008 Remix to the song, which contains a part from the UEFA Euro 2008 Official Theme song in the beginning of the song.

Reception
Media reaction to the song has largely been negative, most finding it inappropriate for the venue. Darryl Broadfoot, of the Scottish newspaper The Herald, called it a "cheesy, synth-driven melody". The Norwegian newspaper Dagbladet, in reviewing the song, found that it lacked purpose and motivation, and that it had little to do with football. The reviewers called the song a rejected B-side, and gave it one out of six points. Nick Amies, of Deutsche Welle, called "Can You Hear Me" an "insipid and un-footie-inspiring, corporate sell-out single". He also reported that spectators preferred the song "Seven Nation Army" by The White Stripes as an alternative, unofficial anthem.

Track listings
 CD1
 "Can You Hear Me" (Main version) — 3:44
 "Can You Hear Me" (UEFA remix) — 5:54

 CD2
 "Can You Hear Me" (Main version) — 3:44
 "Can You Hear Me" (Moto Blanco radio mix) — 3:30
 "Can You Hear Me" (Moto Blanco club mix) — 8:30
 "Can You Hear Me" (Moto Blanco dub) — 8:00

 Europe
 "Can You Hear Me" (Main version) — 3:44
 "Can You Hear Me" (Moto Blanco radio mix) — 3:30
 "Can You Hear Me" (Moto Blanco club mix) — 8:30
 "Can You Hear Me" (UEFA remix) — 5:54

 France
 "Can You Hear Me" (Main Version) - 3:44
 "Can You Hear Me" (Glam As You Full Club Mix by Guena LG) - 6:57
 "Can You Hear Me" (Moto Blanco Club Mix) - 8:30

Charts

Weekly charts

Year-end charts

See also
Dutch Top 40 number-one hits of 2008

References

External links
 Media release from UEFA 

2008 singles
Enrique Iglesias songs
Football songs and chants
Dutch Top 40 number-one singles
Songs written by Enrique Iglesias
2008 songs
Interscope Records singles
Songs written by Steve Morales
UEFA Euro 2008
UEFA European Championship official songs and anthems